Leonard A. (Len) Schlesinger is an American author, educator, and business leader. He is currently the Baker Foundation Professor at Harvard Business School and President Emeritus of Babson College where he served as the college's 12th President from 2008 through 2013.

Early life and education
Schlesinger graduated from Brown University with an A.B. in American Civilization in 1972. He received an MBA with a concentration in corporate and labor relations from Columbia University and a Doctor of Business Administration/Doctorate in Organizational Behavior from Harvard Business School in 1979.

Career

Harvard Business School
Schlesinger served as a member of the Harvard Business School (HBS) faculty between 1978 and 1985, 1988 to 1998 and 2013 to the present.  He taught MBA and Executive Education program courses in Leadership, Human resource management, Organizational Behavior, Organization Design, General Management, Entrepreneurial Management, and Service Management In 1993-94 academic year, Schlesinger oversaw the school's MBA program review and redesign process. He also served as the HBS Senior Associate Dean for External Relations and head of the HBS Service Management Interest Group.

Babson College
Schlesinger became the 12th president of Babson College on July 1, 2008 and served for five years before stepping down at the end of the 2013 academic year. During his tenure Schlesinger extended the school's entrepreneurship methodology into the undergraduate, graduate, executive education, and Babson Global programs. During this period, Babson focused on increasing diversity, growing the undergraduate student population, and strengthening academic quality. Schlesinger received an honorary doctorate from Babson, and in 2015 the college named the Leonard A. Schlesinger Innovation Center in his honor.

Private sector
Schlesinger worked for Procter & Gamble Paper Products Company from 1973 through 1975 where he was an organizational development specialist and worked as a team leader in the facial tissue converting area.

Between 1985–1988, Schlesinger served as Executive Vice President and Chief Operating Officer at Au Bon Pain.

Schlesinger held multiple roles at L Brands, based in Columbus, Ohio as the Chief Operating Officer from February 2003 to July 2007, Executive Vice President from March 2001 to February 2003, and Group President of Beauty and Personal Care from January 2005 to May 2006. While at L Brands, he was responsible for the operational and financial functions across the enterprise including Express, The Limited, Victoria's Secret Beauty, Bath & Body Works, C. O. Bigelow, Henri Bendel and the White Barn Candle Company.

Directorships and board positions
Schlesinger currently serves as a Director of RH (formerly Restoration Hardware) since April 22, 2014 where he is Chair of the Compensation Committee.

Schlesinger and his Babson colleagues helped to orchestrate the pedagogy of the Goldman Sachs 10,000 Small Businesses Initiative where he still serves as an advisory council member. He is also a member of the Council on Competitiveness and the Council on Foreign Relations.

Schlesinger is on the advisory board of Data Point Capital, which invested in the retailer, Print Syndicate, during the fall of 2014. Schlesinger became lead independent director of Demandware which was sold to Salesforce. He also served on several other for profit and nonprofit boards. In September 2009, Schlesinger was elected to the Board of Directors for BJ's Wholesale Club. Beginning in 2009, Schlesinger served as a board member of the Network for Teaching Entrepreneurship, first as Vice Chairman and Governance Committee Chair and most recently on the Board of Overseers.

Schlesinger also serves as a Director of MassChallenge, Viewpost LLC, and the chain restaurant; Next Level Pizza, as a Trustee of Wheaton College, as a member of the President's Council of the Franklin W. Olin College of Engineering, and as an advisory board member of The College for Social Innovation, Institute for Nonprofit Practice, and The Center for Women's Entrepreneurial Leadership at Babson College.

Publications
As an author and co-author, Schlesinger's published writings on organizational management, entrepreneurship, and service management have been widely collected in business libraries.

Books
 Heskett, James L., W. Earl Sasser, and Leonard A. Schlesinger. What Great Service Leaders Know and Do: Creating Breakthroughs in Service Firms. Oakland, CA: Berrett-Koehler Publishers, 2015.
 Brown, Paul B., Charles F. Kiefer, and Leonard A. Schlesinger. Own Your Future: How to Think Like an Entrepreneur and Thrive in an Unpredictable Economy. New York, NY: AMACOM, 2014.
 Schlesinger, Leonard A., Charles Kiefer, and Paul B. Brown. Just Start: Take Action, Embrace Uncertainty, Create the Future. Harvard Business School Press, 2012.
 Schlesinger, Leonard A., Charles Kiefer, and Paul B. Brown. Action Trumps Everything: Creating What You Want in an Uncertain World. Duxbury, MA: Black Ink Press, 2010.
 Heskett, James L., W. Earl Sasser Jr., and Leonard A. Schlesinger. The Value Profit Chain: Treat Employees Like Customers and Customers Like Employees. New York: Free Press, 2003.
 Heskett, J., W. E. Sasser Jr., and L. Schlesinger. The Service Profit Chain: How Leading Companies Link Profit and Growth to Loyalty, Satisfaction, and Value. New York: Free Press, 1997.
 Schlesinger, Leonard A., and Bill Fromm. The Real Heroes of Business...and Not a CEO Among Them. Currency/Doubleday, 1994.
 Schlesinger, P. F., V. Sathe, L. A. Schlesinger, and J. P. Kotter. Organization: Text, Cases, and Readings on the Management of Organizational Design and Change. 3rd ed. Homewood, IL: Irwin, 1992.
 Schlesinger, Leonard A., and Ardis Burst. The Management Game. Viking Press, 1987.
 Schlesinger, Leonard A., Davis Dyer, Thomas Clough, and Dianne Landau. Chronicles of Corporate Change: Management Lessons from AT&T and Its Offspring. Lexington Books, 1987.
 Kotter, J. P., L. A. Schlesinger, and V. Sathe. Organization: Text, Cases, and Readings on the Management of Organizational Design and Change. 2nd ed. Homewood, IL: Richard D. Irwin, 1986.
 Schlesinger, Phyllis F., Leonard A. Schlesinger, Robert G. Eccles, and John J. Gabarro. Instructor's Manual to Accompany Managing Behavior in Organizations: Text, Cases, Readings. New York: McGraw-Hill, 1983.
 Schlesinger, Leonard A., Robert G. Eccles and John J. Gabarro, eds. Managing Behavior in Organizations. New York: McGraw-Hill, 1983.
 Schlesinger, Leonard A. Quality of Work Life and the Supervisor. New York: Praeger, 1982.
 Schlesinger, Leonard A. and Tom Chase, eds. The Ecology of Work: Improving Productivity and the Quality of Work Life: Readings for the fourth Ecology of Work Conference. Arlington, VA: NTL Institute for Applied Behavioral Science, 1981.

Articles and blogs
 Leonard A. Schlesinger. Case Study: Will a Bank’s New Technology Help or Hurt Morale? Harvard Business Review (website) (July–August 2021).
 Schlesinger, Len. The No-excuses Way to Manage Healthcare Growth. athenaInsight (November 28, 2017).
 Schlesinger, Len, and Josh Gray. Giving Doctors What They Need to Avoid Burnout. Harvard Business Review (website) (October 31, 2017).
 Schlesinger, Leonard A. A Better Way to Measure the Patient Experience. athenaInsight (July 11, 2017).
 Schlesinger, Leonard A. Designing the 'Job of the Patient'. athenaInsight (June 21, 2017).
 Schlesinger, Leonard A. How Healthcare Can Avoid a United Airlines Fiasco. athenaInsight (April 27, 2017).
 Schlesinger, Leonard A. Selecting the Right Growth Metrics: Fewer but Better. Stanford Social Innovation Review (website) (April 21, 2017).
 Schlesinger, Leonard A. A Theory for Healthcare: The Service-Profit Chain. athenaInsight (February 7, 2017).
 Schlesinger, Leonard A. Operations: Turning Healthcare Vision into Reality. athenaInsight (December 19, 2016).
 Schlesinger, Len, and John Fox. Giving Patients an Active Role in Their Health Care. Harvard Business Review (website) (November 21, 2016).
 Schlesinger, Leonard A., and Charles Kiefer. Preparing for Uncertainty: How to Use Creaction at Work. European Business Review (January–February 2015): 51–54.
 Kiefer, Charlie, and Leonard A. Schlesinger. When Your Boss Gives You Conflicting Messages. Harvard Business Review (website) (November 27, 2014).
 Schlesinger, Leonard A., and Charlie Kiefer. Prevent Conflicting Messages from Confusing Your Team. Harvard Business Review Blogs (September 26, 2014).
 Schlesinger, Leonard A., and Charlie Kiefer. Internal Entrepreneurs Don't Have to Be Lonely. Harvard Business Review Blogs (August 12, 2014).
 Schlesinger, Leonard A., and Charlie Kiefer. How Internal Entrepreneurs Can Deal With Friendly Fire. Harvard Business Review Blogs (July 24, 2014).
 Kiefer, Charlie, and Leonard A. Schlesinger. Act Like an Entrepreneur Inside Your Organization. Harvard Business Review Blogs (July 14, 2014).
 Schlesinger, Leonard A. It's More Than an Admission Notice... It's a Moral Obligation. Huffington Post, The Blog (January 4, 2013).
 Schlesinger, Leonard A., Charles F. Kiefer, and Paul B. Brown. https://hbr.org/2012/07/is-it-cheating-to-have-a-side Is It Cheating to Have a Side Project?] Harvard Business Review Blogs (July 9, 2012).
 Schlesinger, Leonard A., Charles F. Kiefer, and Paul B. Brown. How to Turn an Obstacle into an Asset. Harvard Business Review Blogs (February 23, 2012).
 Schlesinger, Leonard A., Charles F. Kiefer, and Paul B. Brown. How to Get Your Boss to Say Yes. Harvard Business Review Blogs (April 13, 2012).
 Schlesinger, Leonard A., Charles F. Kiefer, and Paul B. Brown. How to Find the Perfect Job Applicant (or Look Like One). Harvard Business Review Blogs (March 14, 2012).
 Schlesinger, Leonard A., Charles F. Kiefer, and Paul B. Brown. Career Plans Are Dangerous. Harvard Business Review Blogs (March 2, 2012).
 Schlesinger, Leonard A., Charles F. Kiefer, and Paul B. Brown. How to Create Raving Fans. Harvard Business Review Blogs (April 25, 2012).
 Schlesinger, Leonard A., Charles F. Kiefer, and Paul B. Brown. How to Be Happier at Work. Harvard Business Review Blogs (May 29, 2012).
 Schlesinger, Leonard A., Charles F. Kiefer, and Paul B. Brown. Choosing Between Making Money and Doing What You Love. Harvard Business Review Blogs (March 29, 2012).
 Schlesinger, Leonard A., Charles F. Kiefer, and Paul B. Brown. When Should You Quit Your Day Job? Harvard Business Review Blogs (April 5, 2012).
 Schlesinger, Leonard A., Charles F. Kiefer, and Paul B. Brown. What to Do When You Don't Know What to Do. Harvard Business Review Blogs (March 21, 2012).
 Schlesinger, Leonard A., Charles F. Kiefer, and Paul B. Brown. Are You Spending 1,000 Hours Preparing for Your Next Job? Harvard Business Review Blogs (June 27, 2012).
 Schlesinger, Leonard A., Charles F. Kiefer, and Paul B. Brown. https://hbr.org/2012/05/whats-the-biggest-obstacle-to The Biggest Obstacle to Innovation? You.] Harvard Business Review Blogs (May 11, 2012).
 Schlesinger, Leonard A., Charles F. Kiefer, and Paul B. Brown. Who Says Work Has to Be Fulfilling? Harvard Business Review Blogs (June 19, 2012).
 Schlesinger, Leonard A., Charles F. Kiefer, and Paul B. Brown. New Project? Don't Analyze—Act. Harvard Business Review 90, no. 3 (March 2012): 154–158.
 Schlesinger, Leonard A. The Value of Productive Stupidity. Huffington Post, The Blog (July 30, 2012).
 Schlesinger, Leonard A. Don't Forget the Mayors. Huffington Post, The Blog (September 11, 2012).
 Schlesinger, Leonard A., and Daniel Isenberg. Start-up Revolution: Green Shoots of an Entrepreneurial Spring. Forbes.com (June 16, 2011).
 Schlesinger, Leonard A., and Shadid A. Ansari. Supporting Entrepreneurs in Muslim Countries. Bloomberg Businessweek Online (May 11, 2010).
 Schlesinger, Leonard A. How Colleges Can Prosper During the Recession. Bloomberg Businessweek Online (March 23, 2009).
 Schlesinger, Leonard A., and Craig Benson. Entrepreneur in Chief? Obama Shows Signs of Understanding Innovation Process. MarketWatch, Outside the Box (blog) (March 7, 2009).
 Schlesinger, Leonard A. How to Rewrite the Biz-school Curriculum. Providence Journal (January 5, 2009).
 Schlesinger, Leonard A., Peter C. Verhoef, Katherine N. Lemon, A. Parasuraman, Anne Roggeveen, and Michael Tsiros. Customer Experience Creation: Determinants, Dynamics and Management Strategies . Journal of Retailing 85, no. 1 (March 2009).
 Schlesinger, Leonard A., Fred Sanfilippo, Neeli Bendapudi, and Anthony Rucci. Strong Leadership and Teamwork Drive Culture and Performance Change: Ohio State University Medical Center 2000–2006. Academic Medicine 83, no. 9 (September 2008).
 Schlesinger, Leonard A. Interactive Case Study: The Analysis: Babson College Meets the Corporate Gender Challenge. Bloomberg Businessweek Online (September 30, 2008).
 Schlesinger, Leonard A. Campuses Pushing Green Revolution. Providence Journal (January 15, 2008).
 Schlesinger, Leonard A., and James Heskett. Leading the High Capability Organization: Challenges for the Twenty-First Century. Human Resource Management 36, no. 1 (Spring 1997): 105–113.
 Schlesinger, Leonard A. It Doesn't Take a Wizard to Build a Better Boss. Fast Company (June–July 1996).
 Hallowell, Roger, Leonard A. Schlesinger, and Jeffrey Zornitsky. Internal Service Quality, Customer and Job Satisfaction: Linkages and Implications for Managers. Human Resource Planning (fall 1996).
 Schlesinger, Leonard A., and Alan W.H. Grant. Realize Your Customers' Full Profit Potential. Harvard Business Review 73, no. 5 (September–October 1995): 59–72.
 Heskett, J. L., T. O. Jones, G. W. Loveman, W. Earl Sasser, and L. A. Schlesinger. Putting the Service-Profit Chain to Work. Harvard Business Review 72, no. 2 (March–April 1994): 164–174.
 Schlesinger, Leonard A. How to Hire By Wire. Fast Company (October 31, 1993).
 Schlesinger, Leonard A., Christopher L. Hart, and Dan Maher. Guarantees Come to Professional Service Firms. MIT Sloan Management Review 33, no. 3 (Spring 1992): 19–29.
 Schlesinger, Leonard A., and Christopher L. Hart. Total Quality Management and the Human Resource Professional: Applying the Baldrige Framework to Human Resources. Human Resource Management 30, no. 4 (Winter 1991): 433–454.
 Schlesinger, Leonard A., and James Heskett. The Service Driven Service Company. Harvard Business Review 69, no. 5 (September–October 1991): 71–81.
 Schlesinger, Leonard A., and James Heskett. Enfranchisement of Service Workers. California Management Review 33, no. 4 (Summer 1991).
 Schlesinger, Leonard A., and Jeffrey Zornitsky. Job Satisfaction, Service Capability and Customer Satisfaction: An Examination of Linkages and Management Implications. Human Resource Planning 14, no. 2 (1991): 141–149.
 Schlesinger, Leonard A., and James Heskett. Breaking the Cycle of Failure in Services. MIT Sloan Management Review 32, no. 3 (spring 1991): 17–28.
 Finkelman, Dan, Tony Goland, Leonard A. Schlesinger, Dinah Nemeroff, Ron Zemke, and Claus Moller. Case of the Complaining Customer (HBR Case Study and Commentary). Art. 90304. Harvard Business Review 68, no. 3 (May–June 1990).
 Schlesinger, Leonard A. Service Fundamentals. Restaurant Business (May 23, 1988).
 Schlesinger, Leonard A., and Richard J. Balzer. An Alternative to Buzzword Management: The Culture-Performance Link. Personnel (September 1985).
 Schlesinger, Leonard A., and Barry Oshry. Quality of Work Life and the Manager: Muddle in the Middle. Organizational Dynamics 13, no. 1 (Summer 1984): 5–19.
 Schlesinger, Leonard A. Doing What's Right vs. Doing the Right Thing: The Normative Underpinnings of Human Resource Strategy. Human Resource Management 22, nos. 1/2 (Spring 1983).
 Schlesinger, Leonard A., and John P. Kotter. Overcoming Fear and Change: A Professional Approach. Journal of Accountancy (March–April 1979).
 Schlesinger, Leonard A., and John P. Kotter. Choosing Strategies for Change. Harvard Business Review 57, no. 2 (March–April 1979).
 Schlesinger, Leonard A., and Michael McCaskey. A Consumer Guide to Six Introductory Organizational Behavior Textbooks. Exchange: The Organizational Behavior Teaching Journal (Winter 1979).
 Schlesinger, Leonard A., and Richard E. Walton. Do Supervisors Thrive in Participative Work Systems? Organizational Dynamics 7, no. 3 (Winter 1979): 24–38.
 Schlesinger, Leonard A., and Richard E. Walton. The Process of Work Restructuring and Its Impact on Collective Bargaining. Monthly Labor Review 100, no. 4 (April 1977): 52–55.
 Schlesinger, Leonard A. Performance Improvement: The Missing Component of Appraisal Systems. Personnel (June 1976).

References

Year of birth missing (living people)
Living people
Harvard Business School faculty
American business theorists
Harvard Business School alumni
Columbia Business School alumni
Brown University alumni
Babson College alumni
Presidents of Babson College